Pedro Esteban Carve Pérez was a Uruguayan politician who served as the President of the Senate and who became the head of state of Uruguay for one single day on January 22, 1875. He served as the President of the Senate of Uruguay in 1875 and in 1885. He served as the President of the Chamber of Deputies in 1876.

References

Uruguayan people of German descent
Colorado Party (Uruguay) politicians
Presidents of Uruguay
Presidents of the Senate of Uruguay
Presidents of the Chamber of Representatives of Uruguay